Young's equation may refer to:
 Young–Laplace equation, describes the capillary pressure difference sustained across the interface between two static fluids
 Young–Dupré equation, applies to wetting of ideal solid surfaces